Wojciech Fibak and Miloslav Mečíř were the defending champions, but none competed this year.

Sergio Casal and Emilio Sánchez won the final by defeating Magnus Gustafsson and Guillermo Pérez Roldán 7–6, 6–3 in the final.

Seeds

Draw

Draw

References

External links
 Official results archive (ATP)
 Official results archive (ITF)

Dutch Open (tennis)
1988 Grand Prix (tennis)